Craig Joseph Thompson (born 7 January 1995), known by the online community as Mini Ladd, is an Emirati-born British entertainer, comedian, vlogger, gamer and YouTuber. As of August 2019, he has accumulated over 10 million followers across all social platforms (YouTube, Twitter and Instagram), over 1.4 billion views, and averages roughly 50,000 concurrent viewers during his live-streams. In September 2019, Thompson was named No. 3 out of the Top 100 Influencers in the UK by the Sunday Times. His father is English and his mother is Northern Irish.

Career and donations 
Thompson launched his first YouTube channel, "Mini Ladd", in May 2011, posting mainly gaming-related content and compilation videos. In 2018, he launched his second channel, "Craig Thompson", wherein the content was mainly off of vlogs. In 2019, he launched his third YouTube channel, "Mini Ladd Vault", wherein he uploads old videos off his Mini Ladd channel which were previously demonetized or taken down.
In 2018, Thompson partnered with the Thirst Project and raised over $150,000 for relief. In 2019, the Thirst Project named him as one of their board members; as of October 2022, he is no longer a board member.

In 2019 City of Derry R.F.C. renamed their stadium to the "Craig Thompson Stadium". City of Derry ended their relationship with Thompson in July 2020 following sexual misconduct allegations made against him.

In September 2019 Thompson was named by The Sunday Times as one of Britain's top 100 influencers, behind KSI and PewDiePie.

References

People from County Londonderry
People educated at Foyle College
Let's Players
YouTubers from Northern Ireland
1995 births
Living people
People from Dubai
Video bloggers
YouTube vloggers
YouTube controversies
Emirati people of British descent
Emirati people of English descent